Tablelands  may refer to:

Places

Australia
 Tablelands, Northern Territory, a locality
 Tablelands, Queensland (Gladstone Region), a locality in Queensland
 Tablelands, Queensland (South Burnett Region), a locality in Queensland
 Tablelands Region, a local government area in Queensland 
 Electoral district of Tablelands, an electoral district in Queensland

Canada
 The Tablelands in Gros Morne National Park, Canada

See also
 Plateaus